Healthy Homes Australia is an Australian lifestyle television series aired for its debut on Network Ten on 24 January 2015 every Saturday for 13 episodes. In 2019 season 8 will broadcast. It is presented by Walt Collins and Dani Wales. The series is based around home, garden, building and construction and enjoys solid ratings. The program airs on Saturday afternoons at 2pm and is repeated on Sunday for an encore broadcast.

References 

Network 10 original programming
Australian non-fiction television series
2015 Australian television series debuts